Polná (German: Hirschfeld) is a village in Karlovy Vary Region, Czech Republic. It is one of the six municipality districts of Hazlov. In 2001 the village had a population of 45.

Geography 
Polná lies 2.5 kilometres southwest from Hazlov, about 535 meters above sea level. It is surrounded by forests. It neighbour with Hazlov to the east, with Lipná to the north, with Táborská to the southeast and with Libá to the southwest. To the west there is the German border.

History 
Polná was first mentioned in 1307, as a property of the Zedtwitz from Libá. From 1850 was part of Aš District, and few years later create its own municipality, with Podílná and Franky. In these days, Polná is a part of the municipality of Hazlov. In  the 1960s a border-guard (Pohraniční stráž) base, was built close to the village.

Landmarks 
 Frame house from 1792, with Virgin Mary painting and with a chapel,
 two crucifix,
 conciliation cross.

Gallery

References 

Hazlov
Villages in Cheb District